Michael Byrne (born 7 November 1943) is a British actor known for his roles in the National Theatre, Hollywood films, and television shows.

Early life 
Byrne was born in London, England, to Helen Byrne of Kilkenny, Ireland, a single parent.

Life and career
Byrne is a long-established stage actor, having joined the National Theatre in 1964 and appearing in many seasons since. He has also appeared on stage throughout the world. He has numerous theatre credits to his name including: Roberto Miranda in Death and the Maiden at the Royal Court, Maskwell in The Double Dealer and Claudio in Much Ado About Nothing at the National Theatre, Reg in Butley at The Criterion, and also The Cherry Orchard, The Seagull, Romeo and Juliet, Mayor of Zalamea, All My Sons, Lulu, Faith Healer, Duchess of Malfi, A Slight Ache, and Molly Sweeney amongst many others.

During his career he has played many German military roles such as Colonel Vogel in Indiana Jones and the Last Crusade, Major Schroeder in Force 10 from Navarone, Reinhard Beck in The Scarlet and the Black and General Olbricht in The Plot to Kill Hitler. He was also the SS interrogator in Rogue Male. Byrne appeared as a Jewish concentration camp survivor who is instrumental in the capture of a Nazi war criminal (played by Sir Ian McKellen) in the film Apt Pupil.

He is also familiar to audiences as Smythe, a soldier who attempts to rape William Wallace's wife and first inspires Wallace to seek independence from England in the film Braveheart.

His other film credits include The Eagle Has Landed, Butley, A Bridge Too Far, The Medusa Touch, The Saint, Tomorrow Never Dies, The Good Father, The Sum of All Fears, Gangs of New York, Harry Potter and the Deathly Hallows Part 1, Mortdecai.

On television, he has appeared in  Thriller, Tales of the Unexpected, The Professionals (TV Series), The Devil's Crown, Smiley's People, Yes, Prime Minister, Lord Mountbatten: The Last Viceroy, Between The Lines, Sharpe, Hornblower, A Touch of Frost, (The episode "Quarry", in which he played the father of Allie Byrne, his real-life daughter), Agatha Raisin (Hell’s Bells),  Midsomer Murders (The Ghost of Causton Abbey), The Mists of Avalon, Waking the Dead, The Body Farm, Honest, Hamish Macbeth, and Casualty.

From April 2008 to January 2010, Byrne starred in Coronation Street, as Ted Page, Gail Platt's long lost father and the ex-lover of Audrey Roberts.

Byrne appeared in State of Play at the Edinburgh Festival written by Zia Trench.

He played Romeo to Siân Phillips' Juliet at the Bristol Old Vic.

He played Alfred Maxwell in BBC's Casualty, a terminally ill man with motor neuron disease and his friendship with clinical lead Connie Beauchamp.

He plays Bruce Titchener in The Archers.

Filmography

References

External links
 

1943 births
Living people
English male film actors
English male television actors
English people of Irish descent
Male actors from London
20th-century English male actors
21st-century English male actors